Brown Girl Begins is a 2017 Canadian science fiction film, directed by Sharon Lewis. The film was inspired by Nalo Hopkinson's 1998 novel Brown Girl in the Ring, although for budgetary reasons Lewis opted to write and film a prequel story rather than literally adapting the novel itself.

Set in a post-apocalyptic version of Toronto in 2049, the film focuses on a small group of survivors whose continued survival depends on Ti-Jeanne's (Mouna Traoré) response to a potentially life-altering decision. The cast also includes Nigel Shawn Williams, Shakura S'Aida, Emmanuel Kabongo, Rachael Crawford, Andy McQueen and Measha Brueggergosman.

The film premiered at the Urbanworld Film Festival in 2017. It had its general theatrical release in 2018 in conjunction with Black History Month, although due to the film's Afrofuturist themes its commercial opening was branded as a "Black Futures Month" event.

The film received two Canadian Screen Award nominations at the 7th Canadian Screen Awards in 2019, for Best Adapted Screenplay (Lewis) and Best Makeup (Carla Hutchinson).

See also
Afrofuturism in film

References

External links
 
 Brown Girl Begins at Library and Archives Canada

2017 films
2017 science fiction films
Afrofuturist films
Canadian science fiction films
Black Canadian films
English-language Canadian films
Films based on Canadian novels
Films based on science fiction novels
2010s English-language films
2010s Canadian films